In mathematics, Euler's four-square identity says that the product of two numbers, each of which is a sum of four squares, is itself a sum of four squares.

Algebraic identity
For any pair of quadruples from a commutative ring, the following expressions are equal:

Euler wrote about this identity in a letter dated May 4, 1748 to Goldbach (but he used a different sign convention from the above). It can be verified with elementary algebra. 

The identity was used by Lagrange to prove his four square theorem. More specifically, it implies that it is sufficient to prove the theorem for prime numbers, after which the more general theorem follows. The sign convention used above corresponds to the signs obtained by multiplying two quaternions.

This property is the definitive feature of composition algebras.

Hurwitz's theorem states that an identity of form,

Proof of the identity using quaternions
Comment: The proof of Euler's four-square identity is by simple algebraic evaluation. Quaternions derive from the four-square identity, which can be written as the product of two inner products of 4-dimensional vectors, yielding again an inner product of 4-dimensional vectors: . This defines the quaternion multiplication rule , which simply reflects Euler's identity, and some mathematics of quaternions. Quaternions are, so to say, the "square root" of the four-square identity. But let the proof go on: 

Let  and  be a pair of quaternions. Then

and

No parentheses are necessary above, because quaternions associate. The conjugate of a product is equal to the commuted product of the conjugates of the product's factors, so

Then

So,

Pfister's identity
Pfister found another square identity for any even power: 

Thus, another four-square identity is as follows:

Incidentally, the following identity is also true:

See also
Brahmagupta–Fibonacci identity (sums of two squares)
Degen's eight-square identity
Pfister's sixteen-square identity
Latin square

References

External links
A Collection of Algebraic Identities
 Lettre CXV from Euler to Goldbach

Elementary algebra
Elementary number theory
Mathematical identities
Squares in number theory
Leonhard Euler